Engin Verel (born 15 September 1956) is a Turkish former professional footballer who spent most of his career with İstanbul-based rivals Fenerbahçe and Galatasaray.

Career
Verel was born in İstanbul. He made his debut at the age of 17 with Galatasaray in 1973. He then moved to Fenerbahçe in 1975 where he played until 1979. He won 2 Turkish League titles with Fenerbahçe. He made 26 appearances for the Turkey national team.

He also played abroad for Hertha BSC in Germany, RSC Anderlecht in Belgium and Lille OSC in France. In 1983, Verel returned to his homeland, joining again Fenerbahçe he played there until his retirement in 1986.

References

External links
 
 

1956 births
Living people
Association football midfielders
Association football forwards
Turkish footballers
Turkey international footballers
Fenerbahçe S.K. footballers
Galatasaray S.K. footballers
Hertha BSC players
R.S.C. Anderlecht players
Lille OSC players
Bundesliga players
Ligue 1 players
Belgian Pro League players
Süper Lig players
Expatriate footballers in Germany
Turkish expatriate sportspeople in Germany
Expatriate footballers in Belgium
Expatriate footballers in France
Turkish expatriate sportspeople in France
Turkish expatriate footballers